The 1932 Tulane Green Wave football team represented Tulane University during the 1932 Southern Conference football season. Don Zimmerman was All-American.

Before the season
Previously in 1927, Nollie Felts played baseball with the Hattiesburg Pinetoppers of the Cotton States League, which resulted in his ineligibility ruled by the Southern Conference for the 1932 college football season. The Greenies lost "their great leader" Felts shortly before opening week against Texas A&M.

Schedule

References

Tulane
Tulane Green Wave football seasons
Tulane Green Wave football